General Sir Robert Maclagan  (14 December 1820 – 1894) was a British Army officer and military engineer. He served most of his career in India.

Life

He was born on 14 December 1820 the son of Jane Whiteside and her husband, the eminent Edinburgh physician David Maclagan. His childhood home was 22 George Street in the centre of Edinburgh’s New Town.

He was educated at the High School in Edinburgh and the University of Edinburgh but did not graduate. He then went to Addiscombe Military Seminary near London. He joined the Honourable East India Company as a 2nd Lieutenant in 1839. He then went to the School of Military Engineering in Chatham, to specialise as an engineer. He arrived in Delhi in India in 1842. He was in charge of the engineering works for the defence of Lahore in March 1846. Following severe illness he was given more sedate duties, including running the Civil Engineering College at Rurki aged 27. In the Mutiny of 1857 he successfully defended Rurki against the rebel forces. In his military career he rose to the rank of General, first in the Bengal Engineers then in the Royal Engineers.

In 1853 he was elected a Fellow of the Royal Society of Edinburgh his proposer being Sir Robert Christison.

From 1861 he ran the Public Works Department for all of the Punjab. Queen Victoria created him a Knight of the Order of St Michael and St George (KCMG) for his efforts.

He retired in 1879. He spent most of his final years between Edinburgh and London.

He died in 1894.

Family
His brothers included Andrew Douglas Maclagan and Rev William Maclagan, Archbishop of York.

His children included Robert Smeiton Maclagan CIE, Sir Edward Douglas Maclagan KCIE.

He was uncle to Robert Craig Maclagan.

References

1820 births
1893 deaths
Military personnel from Edinburgh
Fellows of the Royal Society of Edinburgh
19th-century Scottish people
British Army generals
Scottish engineers
Royal Engineers officers
British East India Company Army generals
Knights Commander of the Order of St Michael and St George
Bengal Engineers officers
British military personnel of the Indian Rebellion of 1857